Shadows over Innistrad is a Magic: The Gathering expansion block consisting of the sets Shadows over Innistrad and Eldritch Moon.

Mechanics
Shadows over Innistrad has five main mechanics:
 Madness: a returning mechanic from Torment that allows a player to cast a card for its madness cost instead of being discarded. This is shown on the card . 
 Delirium: counts the number of different card types in a player's graveyard. If that player has four or more card types among cards in their graveyard (e.g. creature, instant, sorcery, land), delirium will grant specific effects or bonuses, like the card . 
 Investigate: a keyword that creates a Clue artifact token that you may pay 2 generic mana and sacrifice to draw a card, as seen on cards like . 
 Transform: a returning mechanic from original Innistrad, allowing the card to "transform" to its back side if certain conditions are met, such as the card . 

Eldritch Moon features four returning mechanics from Shadows over Innistrad (all but Investigate) while introducing three new mechanics:
 Meld: causes two separate creature cards to transform and combine into a single creature when certain conditions are met, creating an oversized card.
 Escalate: An ability appearing on modal instant and sorcery spells.

Storyline
The denizens of Innistrad are beset on all sides. Their faith in the archangel Avacyn brought them strength when fighting against demons, werewolves, vampires, and all manners of horrors. But, now the mighty protector of the plane has been twisted into something monstrous by an outside influence. A very familiar force has stepped into the gothic world, and its corrupting tendrils now touch everything.

Trivia
The "Shadows over Innistrad" block contains minor references to H. P. Lovecraft's The Shadow over Innsmouth. "Shadows over Innistrad" tells the story of the planeswalker Jace Beleren investigating the source of madness affecting the residents of Innistrad and their angelic protectors. The source is revealed to be Emrakul, one of a race of ancient beings called Eldrazi, who draw heavy influence from Lovecraft. In addition to inducing madness, Emrakul's influence warps the physiology of living beings in her vicinity, giving them a distinctive "look" of latticed flesh, additional appendages, and other strange mutations, similar to the story of The Shadow over Innsmouth and its follow-up anthology "Shadows over Innsmouth".

References

Magic: The Gathering blocks
Magic: The Gathering sets
Werewolf games
Vampires in games
Zombies and revenants in popular culture
Detective fiction
Angels in popular culture
Works based on The Shadow over Innsmouth